JSV may refer to:

 Jewish Socialist Verband, an American political party
 Journal of Sound and Vibration
 Sallisaw Municipal Airport, in Oklahoma, United States

See also

 
 JVS (disambiguation)
 SVJ (disambiguation)
 SJV (disambiguation)
 VJS (disambiguation)